Mehar Bano aur Shah Bano is a Pakistani drama which aired on Hum TV in 2012. It is the story of how the lives of two sisters, Mehar Bano and Shah Bano, changes after the death of their parents. It was directed by Fahim Burney and written by Seema Ghazal.

Plot

Cast
 Mahnoor Baloch as Mehar Bano, the older sister.
 Sara Loren as Shah Bano, the younger sister who falls for Faraz.
 Nauman Ijaz as Faraz, falls in love with Mehar Bano.
 Adnan Siddiqui as Nasir, Mehar Bano's husband.
 Azfar Rehman as the brother of the sisters.
 Benita David
 Farhan Ali Agha as Hashim, Rano's husband and Haris' father 
 Nazli Nasr as Rano Aapi. Her son, Haris provides shelter to Shah Bano.
 Hira Tareen
 Maheen Rizvi
 Farah Nadir
 Ahmed Zeb
 Atif Rathor
 Farooq Zameer
 Afaq Chaudhry
 Parveen Malik
 Afzal Latifi
 Sidra Sajid

References

2012 Pakistani television series debuts
Pakistani drama television series
Urdu-language television shows
Hum TV original programming
2012 Pakistani television series endings